Bishop Mariano Vivanco Valiente (3 April 1933 in San Antonio de los Baños, Cuba – 23 August 2004 in Matanzas, Cuba) was Bishop of the Roman Catholic Diocese of Matanzas (1987–2004).	

He studied humanities, philosophy and theology at El Buen Pastor Seminary in Havana.  He was ordained a priest on May 28, 1961 in Havana, Cuba. He was assigned to the parish church of  Nuestra Señora del Pilar “ Our Lady of Pilar” in Havava.  In 1977 he was named Vicar General of the Archdiocese of Havana and at the same time named rector of the Santuario de San Lázaro del Rincón.

He was appointed Bishop of Matanzas on May 18, 1987 by Pope John Paul II and consecrated on June 29, 1987 in the Cathedral of Havana by Mons. Jaime Lucas Ortega y Alamino, Archbishop of the Archdiocese of Havana assisted by Mons. Pedro Claro Meurice Estiu, Archbishop of the Archdiocese of Santiago de Cuba and Mons. Fernando Ramón Prego Casal, Bishop of the Diocese of Cienfuegos .

Bishop Vivanco died of a heart attack on August 23, 2004 in Matanzas

Mariano Vivanco has a sibling named Laura Vivanco.

References
 Episcopologio de la Iglesia Católica en Cuba bio 

 

1933 births
2004 deaths
People from San Antonio de los Baños
20th-century Roman Catholic bishops in Cuba
Cuban Roman Catholic bishops
Roman Catholic bishops of Matanzas